The Great Love (Swedish: Den stora kärleken) is a 1938 Swedish comedy film directed by Anders Henrikson and starring Tutta Rolf, Håkan Westergren and Karin Swanström. It was shot at the Råsunda Studios in Stockholm. The film's sets were designed by the art director Arne Åkermark.

Synopsis
Agenes, a maid, leads a lonely life. A friendly worker at a local food stall tries to cheer her up by inventing a secret romantic admirer.

Cast
 Tutta Rolf as 	Agnes
 Håkan Westergren as 	Gustav Fagerlund
 Karin Swanström as 	Hulda Fagerlund
 Eric Abrahamsson as 	August Fagerlund
 Marianne Löfgren as 	Molly
 Elof Ahrle as 	Kalle
 Magnus Kesster as Hugge
 Vera Lindby as 	Flora
 Mimi Pollak as 	Governess
 Douglas Håge as 	Foreman
 Millan Bolander as 	Mrs. Grönberg
 Anders Frithiof as 	Doctor
 Anders Henrikson as 	Man on Train
 Linnéa Hillberg as 	Ms. Blomberg
 Jullan Jonsson as Caretaker's Wife
 Gun-Mari Kjellström as Ingeborg

References

Bibliography 
 Qvist, Per Olov & von Bagh, Peter. Guide to the Cinema of Sweden and Finland. Greenwood Publishing Group, 2000.

External links 
 

1938 films
Swedish comedy films
1938 comedy films
1930s Swedish-language films
Films directed by Anders Henrikson
Swedish black-and-white films
Swedish films based on plays
1930s Swedish films